St John's Regional College is a Catholic co-educational secondary school located in Dandenong region in the south-eastern suburbs of Melbourne, Victoria, Australia.

College history 
St John's Regional College began when the parish priests of the region recognised the need for a secondary boys' school in the area.  There had been an increasing number of students who were continuing their education beyond primary school and many were required to travel considerable distances to access this education.

St Mary's Primary School staffed by the Presentation Sisters had educated both girls and boys through Prep to Grade 6 and for many into Form I and Form II.

In 1957 after a successful approach to the De La Salle Brothers to staff a new school, St John's Boys School opened in 1958 with the Founding Principal Brother Amedy Molloy.  Initially the first classes taught on February 4, 1958, Grade 6, Form I and Form II were in classrooms at St Mary's. Amedy had charge of Form 1 and Form II in one room with 38 and 13 students respectively and J F Maher took over the Grade 6 with 69 students.

It was not long until the new school moved 'across the road' into their own building.  It was just a tin shed on the site for the new building, with 120 boys, and students were called to class by a bell hanging in a gum tree.

In the ensuing years St John's Boys School continued to grow. The ground floor of new brick building in New Street was completed in 1959, with the second floor completed in 1960. In 1965 it was recognised that St John's Boys School needed a new location and was serving a much wider area.

In 1966, for the first time, St John's was a regional college serving the parishes of St Mary's Dandenong, St Gerard's North Dandenong, St Anthony's Noble Park, Holy Family Doveton, St Paul Apostle (North and South) Endeavour Hills and St Michael's Berwick.

In late November 1967 the new buildings in Caroline Street Dandenong were officially opened and blessed by Archbishop Knox, and in on the first day of school in 1968 Form I – VI boys began life at the then new and now current location of St John's.  The Grade 5 and Grade 6 boys who had been part of St John's Boys School now returned to be part of St Mary's School.

The secondary girls at St Mary's became St Mary's Girls Secondary College (1968) and later the same year changed name to St Angela's (in honour of Angela Burke, one of the founding Presentation Sisters in Dandenong).  1968 saw the sharing of resources/teachers between St Angela's and St John's, particularly for Matriculation classes.

In 1970 the decision was made to amalgamate St John's and St Angela's, and in 1971 Senior co-education classes were conducted on the Caroline Street site as well as Junior and Middle Secondary Boys' classes.  The Junior and Middle Secondary Girls' classes remained at St Angela's on their McCrae Street site until the last year of St Angela's 1973.

In 1974 the whole College was on one campus and was known as St John's Regional College. Senior, Form V and VI, classes were co-ed and Form I – IV were separate boys' and girls' classes and in fact housed completely separately. During 1976 much discussion was held regarding full co-education and in 1977 the first Catholic co-educational regional college in the nation was born. This development coincided with significant enrolment increases.

Further needs for Catholic Secondary education in the region saw the establishment of St Francis Xavier College Beaconsfield in 1978 and Nazareth College Noble Park North in 1985. With the establishment of these Colleges the regional parishes to whom St John's served was also changed. Some of this change was also due to the establishment of new parishes in the region.

An refurbishment program commenced in 2016 with the provision of improved contemporary learning spaces, sporting facilities and a new Learning Common evolving from the former Education Resource Centre (Library). A range of upgraded and new passive and active outdoor recreation spaces have also been included. To be completed in early 2017, the learning spaces being created will also feature a new Community Garden with outdoor classrooms. Providing links to the local community and Dandenong Market the Eagle Community Garden will provide structured workplace learning opportunities for students in Year 9 and 10 as well as Horticulture / Agriculture Studies in the senior year levels. The outdoor classrooms and Eagle Community Garden will also provide further curriculum opportunities across a range of learning areas from Years 7 through 12. 

Throughout 2017, the College will undertake an extensive consultation with families, parishes, students and the community on a new masterplan.

House system 
In 2008 St John's established a vertical House System which operates from Year 7 to Year 12. 

 Each House consists of seven Homeroom Groups, which consist of approximately 5 students from each of the 7 – 12 year levels.
 Each House has coordinator who is responsible for the overall development of each individual's sense of belonging, loyalty and spirit in his/her House, as well as for administrative tasks.
 Each Homeroom Group is immediately cared for by the Homeroom teacher. As much as possible, the same Homeroom teacher will remain with the students throughout their enrolment at the College.
 Family members are placed in the same House but not usually in the same Homeroom Group.
 The Homeroom Groups meet for 18 minutes each morning.
 On different occasions, greater amounts of time are spent on House functions and House assemblies to give students an opportunity to gather together to acknowledge student achievement and foster House spirit.

The House Coordinators oversee pastoral care of the students in their care. Dimensions of pastoral care include: 
 pastoral care programs;
 appropriate behaviour of students;
 the correct wearing of Uniform;
 late arrivals and absenteeism of students;
 student progress;
 student subject selection and transition;
 student promotion; and
 conducting meetings and organising House activities with the House Leaders and Homeroom Representatives

College Principals 
Amedy Molloy 1958 – 1969
Domenic Della Bosca 1970 – 1975
Leo Scollen 1976 – 1982
Kevin Maloney 1983 – 1987
Michael Quin 1988 – 1991
Patrick Power 1992– 2008
Andrew Walsh 2009 – 2016
Brendan Watson 2016 – end of 2016 (interim Principal)
Tim Hogan 2017 –

Sport 
St John's is a member of the Southern Independent Schools (SIS).

SIS premierships 
St John's has won the following SIS senior premierships.

Combined:

 Athletics (12) - 1981, 1982, 1983, 1984, 1990, 1991, 1993, 1997, 1998, 2002, 2003, 2004
 Swimming (7) - 1981, 1982, 1983, 1984, 1985, 1986, 1987

Boys:

 Basketball (7) - 1999, 2001, 2005, 2006, 2007, 2014, 2017
 Cricket (4) - 2000, 2001, 2005, 2008
 Football (4) - 2004, 2005, 2006, 2007
 Soccer (4) - 2012, 2013, 2017, 2018

Girls:

 Basketball - 2002
 Netball (5) - 1999, 2001, 2005, 2006, 2007
 Soccer - 2017

Notable alumni
Stephen Allan – professional golfer
Andrew Bogut – basketball player (Golden State Warriors)
Daniela Di Toro – wheelchair tennis player
Frank Drmic – basketball player
Peter Filipovic - CEO of Carlton & United Breweries
Digby Ioane – rugby union player (The Wallabies, Queensland Reds)
Scott McDonald – soccer player (Celtic F.C., Middlesbrough F.C., Socceroos)
Geraldine Quinn – comedian
Adam Ramanauskas – Australian rules footballer (Essendon Football Club)
Paul Wade - captain of the Socceroos, Australia's national football team.
Majak Mawith - Professional soccer player
Jay Kennedy-Harris- AFL Footballer

References

External links
Official website

Dandenong
1958 establishments in Australia
Catholic secondary schools in Victoria (Australia)
Educational institutions established in 1958
Dandenong, Victoria
Buildings and structures in the City of Greater Dandenong